Camp Alert may refer to:

Camp Alert (California), a Civil War Union post
Camp on Pawnee Fork, later renamed Camp Alert and later moved to become Fort Larned, a United States Army frontier post